William Comyn was Lord of Badenoch and Earl of Buchan. He was one of the seven children of Richard Comyn, Justiciar of Lothian, and Hextilda of Tynedale. He was born in Scotland, in Altyre, Moray in 1163 and died in Buchan in 1233 where he is buried in Deer Abbey.

William made his fortune in the service of King William I of Scotland fighting the Meic Uilleims in the north. William witnesses no fewer than 88 charters of the king. William was sheriff of Forfar (1195–1211), Justiciar of Scotia (1205–1233) and warden of Moray (1211–12). Between 1199 and 1200, William was sent to England to discuss important matters on King William's behalf with the new king, John.

William was appointed to the prestigious office of Justiciar of Scotia, the most senior royal office in the kingdom, in 1205. Between 1211 and 1212, William, as Warden of Moray (or Guardian of Moray) fought against the insurgency of Gofraid mac Domnaill (of the Meic Uilleim family), whom William beheaded in Kincardine in 1213. Upon finally destroying the Meic Uilleims in 1229, he was given the Lordship of Badenoch and the lands it controlled.

From an unknown date, William held the title Lord of Kilbride.

He helped oversee the construction of St Mungo's Cathedral in Glasgow and after his death, Marjory continued his work there.

Earl of Buchan 

During his period as Warden of Moray, Comyn was so successful, it may have been the reason he received the hand of Marjory (a.k.a. Margaret), Countess of Buchan, sometime between 1209 and 1212. Her father Fergus, Earl of Buchan, had no male heirs and so in marrying his daughter to William he ensured a suitable line for his titles before his death. Dying sometime around 1214 (perhaps earlier) William took over the management of the mormaerdom (earldom) of Buchan, by right of his wife.

Family tree 

William (is believed to have) had six children through his first wife Sarah Fitzhugh and eight through Marjory, Countess of Buchan. The two branches would be associated with the Lordship of Badenoch through his first wife and the Earldom of Buchan through the second. For the historian Alan Young, William's life, and particularly his marriage to the Countess of Buchan, marks the beginning of the "Comyn century".

NB. Children are ranked according to either accounts showing a specific rank in the order of Williams children's birth or according to the earliest available date the child was thought to have been born.

 father Richard Comyn (b.c.1115–1123 d.c.1179); mother Hextilda of Tynedale (a.k.a. Hextilda FitzUchtred or Hextilda FitzWaldeve) (b.1112–1122 d.c. 1149–1189). Hextilda's first husband was Malcolm, 2nd Earl of Atholl, making their son Henry, 3rd Earl of Atholl, William Comyn's half-brother.
 first wife married 1193: Sarah Fitzhugh (a.k.a. Sarah filia Roberti) (b.1155–1160 d.c.1204)
 Richard (b.c.1190–1194 d.c.1244–1249); married to unknown wife; father of John I Comyn, Lord of Badenoch (b.c.1220 d.c.1277)
 Jardine Comyn, Lord of Inverallochy (b. during or before 1190)
 Walter, Lord of Badenoch (b.1190 d.c.1258) married Isabella, Countess of Menteith
 Johanna (a.k.a. Jean) (b.c.1198 d.c.1274); married c.1220: Uilleam I, Earl of Ross (a.k.a. William de Ross) (b.c.1194–1214 d.1274)
 John Comyn, jure uxoris Earl of Angus (died 1242); married (c.1242); Matilda, Countess of Angus (aka. Maud) (b.c.1222, d.1261)
 David Comyn, Lord of Kilbride (died 1247); married Isabel de Valoigne (d.1253)
 second wife married c.1209–1212: Marjory (aka. Margaret), Countess of Buchan (a.k.a. Margaret Colhan of Buchan) (b.c.1184 d.c.1243–1244)
 Idonea (a.k.a. Idoine) (b.c.1215–1221); married 1237: Gilbert de Haya of Erroll (a.k.a. Gilbert de la Hay) (d.1262)
 Alexander, Earl of Buchan (b.c.1217 d.c.1289–1290); married: Elizabetha de Quincy (a.k.a. Isabel) (b.1220 d.1282)
 William (b.c.1217)
 Margaret (b.c. 1218–1230); married Sir John de Keith, Marischal of Scotland (b.1212 d.1270)
 Fergus, Lord of Gorgyn (b.c.1219–1228 d.); married 1249: unknown wife; father of Margaret Comyn (b.c.1270)
 Elizabeth (b.c. 1223 d.1267); married: Uilleam, Earl of Mar (d.1281)
 Agnes (b.c.1225); married 1262: Sir Philip de Meldrum, Justiciar of Scotia (a.k.a. Philip de Fedarg or Philip de Melgarum)

Notes

References
 Young, Alan, Robert the Bruce's Rivals: The Comyns, 1213-1314 (East Linton, 1997)

Lord chancellors of Scotland
William Comyn, jure uxoris Earl of Buchan
Norman warriors
Scoto-Normans
1160s births
1233 deaths
Year of birth uncertain
12th-century Scottish people
13th-century mormaers
Peers jure uxoris
Earls or mormaers of Buchan